Chionographis is a genus of plants in the Melanthiaceae first described as a genus in 1867.  This genus is native to China, Japan, and Korea.

Chionographis species are perennial flowering plants that grow from rhizomes.  They produce a basal rosette of evergreen leaves, from the center of which emerges a flowering scape.  The scape produces a spike of many small white flowers.  The flowers are zygomorphic in shape, and when perfect have six tepals, one pistil, and six stamens.  However, not all individuals have perfect flowers.  Many populations feature gynodioecy, and more rarely, androdioecy.  They are native to China, Japan, and Korea, and typically grow in moist places in the temperate forests' understory.

 species
 Chionographis chinensis K.Krause - Fujian, Guangdong, Guangxi, Hunan
 Chionographis hisauchiana (Okuyama) N.Tanaka - Japan
 Chionographis japonica (Willd.) Maxim. - Japan, Jeju-do
 Chionographis koidzumiana Ohwi - Japan
 Chionographis merrilliana H.Hara - Guangdong, Guangxi
 Chionographis shiwandashanensis Y.Feng Huang & R.H.Jiang - Guangxi

References

External links 
 Flora of China treatment

Melanthiaceae
Melanthiaceae genera